Älvkarleby Municipality (Älvkarleby kommun) is a municipality in Uppsala County in east central Sweden. Its seat is located in the town of Skutskär.

The municipality is one of few in the country which has not been amalgamated since it was created out of a parish when the first local government acts of Sweden were implemented in 1863.

Localities
Gårdskär
Marma
Skutskär (seat)
Älvkarleby

History
Not until late in the Bronze Age (10th century BC) did parts of what is now Älvkarleby begin to rise out of the Baltic Sea. Remains of settlements from that period has been found in the area. In the Early Iron Age (6th-12th century) the population began to grow and people supported themselves on farming, hunting, fishing and livestock. The first mention of Älvkarleby is found in documents from the early Middle Ages (13th century).

Älvkarleby was the hometown of the author Stig Dagerman.

Elections
These are the election results since the 1972 municipal reform. The results of the Sweden Democrats were not published by the SCB between 1988 and 1998 due to the party's small size nationally so has been denoted as "0.0". Älvkarleby has traditionally seen outright majorities for the Social Democrats, although in 2010 and 2014 the party fell just short of 50% of ballots cast in the municipality.

Riksdag

Blocs

This lists the relative strength of the socialist and centre-right blocs since 1973, but parties not elected to the Riksdag are inserted as "other", including the Sweden Democrats results from 1988 to 2006, but also the Christian Democrats pre-1991 and the Greens in 1982, 1985 and 1991. The sources are identical to the table above. The coalition or government mandate marked in bold formed the government after the election. New Democracy got elected in 1991 but are still listed as "other" due to the short lifespan of the party.

See also
Gamlakarleby / Karleby
Nykarleby

References

External links

Älvkarleby Municipality - Official site

Municipalities of Uppsala County